Cousine Island is a small granitic island  in the Seychelles  west of Praslin Island. It is a combination luxury resort and since 1992 a nature preserve.

History
In 1992 the island was purchased and a conservation program was introduced to protect nesting sea turtles and maintain the existing populations of endemic land birds.

Flora & Fauna
Cousine Island is a breeding ground for seabirds and has a population of transplanted Aldabra giant tortoises. The island has undergone an extensive vegetation rehabilitation program which involves planting of indigenous flora and the removal of alien plant species. Since 1995 over 2000 native trees have been planted.

Indo-Pacific hawksbill turtles are known to nest on this island.

Important Bird Area
The island has been identified by BirdLife International as an Important Bird Area because it supports populations of the Seychelles warbler, magpie-robin and fody, as well as substantial breeding colonies of wedge-tailed shearwaters, white-tailed tropicbirds, lesser noddies and white terns.

Tourism
In order to finance the restoration project a small exclusive bungalow resort was built on Cousine. The hotel manager, his family, and an ornithologist with his family, live in the staff quarters on the east beach. They are responsible for the restoration, maintenance and preservation of flora and fauna of the island. The current staff is 16 employees.

There are four beachfront French Colonial style villas (maximum number of guests allowed is 10) on the island.
It is 30 hectares. , it is the world's third most expensive private island.

Image gallery

References

External links

Cousine Island Nature Conservation - Giant Turtle Conservation
Seychelles Magpie Robin Recovery Program
An article in Geographical magazine about the conservation work on Cousine

Islands of Grand'Anse Praslin
Important Bird Areas of Seychelles
Private islands of Seychelles